Ichneutica fibriata is a moth in the family Noctuidae. It is endemic to New Zealand. Specimens of this moth were first collected by Frederick Giles Gibbs. The species is similar in appearance to other species in the Ichneutica genus particularly  I. eris but can be distinguished due to its larger size and more uniform light grey colour. I. fibriata also has a similar coloured thorax and head where as these two anatomical features may differ in colour shade in I. eris. Adults frequent alpine areas and are on the wing in November to January. The life history and the host species of the larvae of this species is unknown.

Taxonomy
The species was first described by Edward Meyrick in 1913 from two specimens collected by Frederick Giles Gibbs and named Aletia fibriata. The male lectotype specimen is held at the Natural History Museum, London. Meyrick in an article published in 1914 stated that the original name was misprinted as Aletia fibriata and the correct spelling was Aletia fibrata. George Hudson, in The Moths and Butterflies of New Zealand, used the species name Alentia fibrata when discussing the species, however more recent publications use the original name of Alentia fibriata.

Prior to 2019, the genus level classification of New Zealand endemic moths within the genus Aletia was regarded as unsatisfactory and was due for revision. As such the species has also been known as Aletia (s.l.) fibriata. In 2019 Robert Hoare undertook a major review of New Zealand Noctuidae. During this review the genus Ichneutica was greatly expanded and the genus Aletia was subsumed into that genus as a synonym. As a result of this review, this species is now known as Ichneutica fibriata.

Description
Meyrick described the species as having a 44-46mm wingspan. Hudson described the species as follows:

This species can be distinguished from similar species by its more uniform slightly grey colour and larger size. The male of the species has a wingspan of between 38 and 46 mm and the female of between 46 and 48.5 mm. It is most similar in appearance to I. eris but is different in that I. fibriata has a similar coloured head and thorax in comparison to I. eris which has a distinctively pale frons.

Distribution 
I. fibriata is rarely collected but has been found on the eastern side of the South Island. There is one record of this species being collected in the Paparoa Range on the West Coast. Specimens have also been collected at Mount Richmond, near Nelson, at Hanmer Springs and there has been one recorded occurrence in the Otago Lakes area.

Habitat 
This species frequents alpine areas.

Behaviour 
I. fibriata adults are on the wing in November to January.

Life history and host species 
The life history of this species is unknown as are the host species of its larvae.

References 

Moths described in 1913
Hadeninae
Moths of New Zealand
Endemic fauna of New Zealand
Taxa named by Edward Meyrick
Endemic moths of New Zealand